Anatoly Savelyev (ru)
 Ivan Savin (ru)
 Andrey Savitsky (ru)
 Aleksandr Savchenko (ru)
 Vadim Cavchuk (ru)
 Anatoly Sagalevich
 Yuri Salimkhanov (ru)
 Nikolai Salnikov (ru)
 Andrey Samankov (ru)
 Viktor Samoylin (ru)
 Sergey Samoylov (ru)
 Aleksandr Samokutyaev
 Leonid Saplitsky (ru)
 Vladimir Sarabeev (ru)
 Igor Sarychev (ru)
 Dmitry Safin (ru)
 Anatoly Safronov (ru)
 Rif Sakhabitdinov (ru)
 Viktor Sviridov (ru)
 Igor Sviridov (ru)
 Vladimir Sevankaev (ru)
 Vladimir Severin (ru)
 Aleksandr Seleznyov (ru)
 Vladimir Selivyorstov (ru)
 Sergey Seliverstov (ru)
 Aleksey Semenkov (ru)
 Vladimir Semenkov (ru)
 Dmitry Semyonov (ru)
 Aleksandr Semerenko (ru)
 Aleksandr Sergeev (ru)
 Vladimir Sergeev (ru)
 Gennady Sergeev (ru)
 Yevgeny Sergeev (ru)
 Igor Sergeev
 Igor Sergun
 Andrey Serdyukov
 Dmitry Serkov (ru)
 Igor Serog (ru)
 Yelena Serova
 Vyacheslav Sivko (ru)
 Roman Sidorov (ru)
 Yuri Sidorov (ru)
 Yevgeny Sizonenko (ru)
 Aleksandr Silin (ru)
 Mikhail Simonov
 Aleksandr Sinelnik (ru)
 Andrey Sinitsyn (ru)
 Timur Sirazetdinov (ru)
 Konstantin Sitkin (ru)
 Aleksey Sitnikov (ru)
 Nikolai Sitnikov (ru)
 Aleksandr Skvortsov (cosmonaut)
 Aleksey Skvortsov (ru)
 Valery Skorokhodov (ru)
 Ilya Skripnikov (ru)
 Oleg Skripochka
 Nikolai Skrypnik (ru)
 Andrey Skryabin (ru)
 Valery Slasten (ru)
 Dmitry Slinkin (ru)
 Viktor Sloka (ru)
 Aleksandr Smirnov (ru)
 Georgy Smirnov (ru)
 Nikolai Smirnov (ru)
 Sergey Olegovich Smirnov (ru)
 Sergey Vladimirovich Smirnov (ru)
 Andrey Sovgirenko (ru)
 Roman Sokolov (ru)
 Sergey Sokolov (ru)
 Andrey Soldatenkov (ru)
 Sergey Solnechnikov
 Dmitry Solovyev (ru)
 Igor Solovyev (ru)
 Aleksandr Solomatin (ru)
 Konstantin Somov (ru)
 Sergey Somov (ru)
 Aleksandr Sorogovets (ru)
 Yuri Sorokin (ru)
 Roman Spiridonov (ru)
 Oleg Spichka (ru)
 Sergey Spravtsev (ru)
 Yuri Stavitsky (ru)
 Igor Stankevich (ru)
 Aleksandr Starovoytov (ru)
 Sergey Stvolov
 Vladimir Stepanov (ru)
 Aleksandr Sterzhantov (ru)
 Valery Stovba (ru)
 Oleg Storozhuk (ru)
 Mikhail Strekalovsky (ru)
 Aleksandr Stytsina (ru)
 Anatoly Sugakov (ru)
 Mukhtar Suleymanov (ru)
 Yuri Sulimenko (ru)
 Serik Sultangabiev (ru)
 Tatyana Sumarokova
 Aleksandr Suponinsky (ru)
 Maksim Suraev
 Konstantin Surkov (ru)
 Sergey Surovikin
 Sergey Sushchenko (ru)
 Pavel Syutin (ru)
 Sergey Shavrin (ru)
 Roman Shadrin (ru)
 Yuri Shadura (ru)
 Minigali Shaymuratov
 Vladimir Shamanov
 Sergey Shantsev (ru)
 Yuri Shargin
 Salizhan Sharipov
 Vladimir Sharpatov
 Vladimir Shatalin (ru)
 Vladimir Shatov (ru)
 Aleksandr Shvaryov (ru)
 Andrey Shevelyov
 Nikolai Shevelyov (ru)
 Sergey Shevelyov (ru)
 Pavel Shevchenko (ru)
 Yuri Shevchenko (ru)
 Sergey Sheyko
 Dmitry Shektaev (ru)
 Ivan Shelokhvostov (ru)
 Vladimir Shendrik (ru)
 Yevgeny Shendrik (ru)
 Andrey Sherstyannikov (ru)
 Yuri Sheffer (ru)
 Vyacheslav Shibilkin (ru)
 Fyodor Shikunov
 Vladimir Shirokov (ru)
 Aleksey Shiryaev (ru)
 Girgory Shiryaev (ru)
 Igor Shifrin (ru)
 Karen Shishkin (ru)
 Anton Shkaplerov
 Pyotr Shkidchenko (ru)
 Valery Shkurny (ru)
 Yevgeny Shnitnikov (ru)
 Sergey Shoygu
 Nikolai Shpitonkov (ru)
 Sergey Shrayner (ru)
 Gennady Shtern (ru)
 Oleg Shubin (ru)
 Lidiya Shulaykina
 Viktor Shulyak (ru)
 Aleksandr Shulyakov (ru)
 Vladimir Shushunov (ru)
 Oleg Shchepetkov (ru)
 Leonid Shcherbakov
 Yuri Shcherbakov (ru)
 Roman Shchetnev (ru)

References 
 

Heroes S